Christopher Alan Strait (born January 14, 1976) is an American comedian and writer. He is best known for being a regular contributor to TRU-TV's World's Dumbest series.

Personal
Strait was born in Inglewood, California, and grew up in the Ladera Heights section of Los Angeles near Baldwin Hills. He is the older of two sons, and also has a half-sister (from father's side).  Strait is of predominately English and German descent, although he claims to be a "European mutt".

He graduated from Culver City High School in 1994, and subsequently earned a bachelor's degree in History from California State University, Dominguez Hills in 1999. Strait then received his master's degree in Psychology from Antioch University in 2001. He had intended to be a psychotherapist, but was told by supervisors that his problem-solving style was "too aggressive".

He began his comedy career while still in graduate school, in the summer of 2000. His Masters Thesis was on the subject of humor. Early influences included Mel Brooks, Bill Cosby, Bob Newhart, and The Smothers Brothers. Later his admiration shifted to the likes of George Carlin, Bill Hicks, Richard Pryor, and Louis CK.  In addition to his comedy career, Strait has also been employed in real estate, finance, behavioral therapy, and journalism.

Strait was previously married from 2004-2017.  He has a daughter (born 2007), and a son (born 2011). He and his second wife had a son in 2018.  They married legally in December 2019, but their official wedding was delayed to June 2021, due to the Covid-19 Pandemic.

Career
Strait has headlined over 50 comedy clubs in the U.S. and Canada, and has also performed for the U.S. military in the USA, as well as in Cuba, Japan, Bahrain and Germany.
"I've been to all 50 states, as well as 6 continents, and 38 countries.  I've done casinos, cruises, corporates, private parties, bars, comedy clubs, colleges, and military bases.  Pretty much all the categories of places one can do stand-up."  After many years hiatus from international shows, Strait performed in South Africa at Goliath and Joe Parker's clubs in Gauteng in 2017.  He has also worked as a private auctioneer and motivational speaker.  From 2018-2020, and 2021 onward. Strait has been primarily performing on cruise ships... but shifted to do over 100 virtual shows for private companies during the Covid-19 pandemic.

In addition to his contributions on TRU-TV, Strait has also done commentary on E!, ESPN, and Fuel TV. He has performed stand-up comedy several times on Fox's "Laughs", as well as single performances on Nickmom, Playboy TV, Bitesize.tv, and Starz. He also wrote/produced/starred in a series of video sketches for YouTube.

Strait has also lent his voice to video games, industrials, and film trailers.  He was a writer for 'National Lampoon's Sports Minute', and appeared in the National Lampoon Film, "Lost Reality 2".

He has self-released two DVD's (2006 – The White DVD / 2009 – Safe Bet), and one CD (2003 – No Point of View). His first commercially available CD, "Hitting The Wall", was shot in Indianapolis in Oct of 2011, and released on Next Round Entertainment's label, on December 13, 2011.  His first commercially available DVD, "Urban Suburbanite" was released on Amazon in September 2015. The special had been shot nearly 3 years earlier, at the Comedy & Magic Club in Hermosa Beach, CA but production issues delayed its release.  It was rereleased on Tubi in 2022.
Strait released three more stand-up comedy CDs in 2019: "Incorrect Correctness" and "Personal Growth" for BSeenMedia. He also self-released "All Full" for all digital platforms. His Dry Bar Comedy Special "Laugh Till You Run Out of Air" was released in January 2020.

Strait has also written and self-released several e-books.  Two books on boxing, "Strait on Boxing", and "Boxing Lists For the Die-Hard Fan", as well as a food review book, entitled "Eating Los Angeles". He has also released three books of poetry, "Free Thinker", "Tongues Lenguas", and "High-Cool" under the pen name, Alan Kimble, in 2016, 2019, and 2020, respectively. 
The last one was a dedicated book of haiku, written during the 2020 Covid-19 quarantine. In September, 2016, he released a travel essay book, entitled "40 Years, 50 States". He also released several books in 2019, "Borderless", a travel journal; "Psychology of Humor" and "Empty Bucket", the latter being his personal memoirs, told via bucket-list format.

Boxing
Strait has worked as a live commentator and ring announcer for professional boxing shows, most notably on CBSSports.com, VYRE, UFC Fightpass, and FITETV.com. He has been a freelance boxing writer, blogger, and vlogger since 2000.  He has written for cyberboxingzone.com, boxingcentral.com, boxingtalk.com, ropeadoperadio.com, and Boxing Digest magazine.  He was the head boxing writer for convictedartist.com and Punch Drunk Sports, and has also hosted several of his own boxing podcasts.

Strait also competed as a boxer, fighting in many underground matches.  He also won a USA Boxing sanctioned Los Angeles area tournament in the Super Heavyweight (over 201 lbs) division in 2001. Extremely nearsighted, he was unable to obtain a professional license.

References 

1976 births
People from Inglewood, California
Living people
People from Hawthorne, California
Boxing commentators
American male poets
American people of English descent
Comedians from California
People from Ladera Heights, California
21st-century American comedians
21st-century American poets
21st-century American male writers